Roll with the Punches may refer to:

Music
Albums
 Roll with the Punches (Van Morrison album), a studio album by Van Morrison
 Roll with the Punches, a compilation album by Garnet Mimms

Songs
 "Roll with the Punches", a song by Patrice Rushen from Shout It Out
 "Roll with the Punches", a song by Randy Newman from Land of Dreams
 "Roll with the Punches", a song by Young MC from Stone Cold Rhymin'
 "Roll with the Punches", a song by A Split-Second from Vengeance C.O.D.
 "Roll with the Punches", a song by Raven from One for All
 "Roll with the Punches", a song by Lenka from Two
 "Roll with the Punches", a song by Dawes from We're All Gonna Die